Francisco Javier Álvarez (born November 19, 2001) is a Venezuelan professional baseball catcher for the New York Mets of Major League Baseball (MLB).

Career
Álvarez signed with the New York Mets as an international free agent in July 2018. He spent his first professional season in 2019 with the Gulf Coast Mets and Kingsport Mets, batting .312 with seven home runs and 26 runs batted in (RBI) over 42 games with both teams. Álvarez did not play a minor league game in 2020 due to the cancellation of the minor league season caused by the COVID-19 pandemic.

The Mets invited Álvarez to their spring training in 2021. He split the season between the St. Lucie Mets and the Brooklyn Cyclones, slashing .272/.388/.554 with 24 home runs and 70 RBI over 99 games. In June, Álvarez was selected to play in the All-Star Futures Game, in which he homered.

Álvarez again participated in spring training with the Mets in 2022.

Álvarez was called up by the New York Mets on September 30, 2022 and made his major league debut as a designated hitter on the same day against the Atlanta Braves. After going hitless in his first eight at bats, Álvarez hit a 439-foot home run off of Washington Nationals reliever Carl Edwards Jr. It was also the first Major League game in which he played catcher. He was the youngest player to appear in the Major Leagues in 2022.

References

External links

2001 births
Living people
People from Guatire
Major League Baseball players from Venezuela
Venezuelan expatriate baseball players in the United States
Major League Baseball catchers
New York Mets players
Gulf Coast Mets players
Kingsport Mets players
St. Lucie Mets players
Brooklyn Cyclones players
Binghamton Rumble Ponies players
Syracuse Mets players